Aura Herzog (Hebrew: אורה הרצוג) ( Ambache, 24 December 1924 – 10 January 2022) was an Israeli social and environmental activist, who served as the First Lady of Israel from 1983 to 1993; she was the wife of Chaim Herzog, the sixth President of the State of Israel and mother of the current president, Isaac Herzog. In 1968, she founded the Council for a Beautiful Israel.

Biography

Early life and work 
Aura Ambache was born in Ismailia, Egypt, on 24 December 1924, to an Ashkenazi Jewish family of Russian Jewish and Polish Jewish descent. Her parents were Leah Steinberg (daughter of Yechiel Michal Steinberg, the founding family of Motza, a village on the outskirts of Jerusalem), and Simcha Ambache (Hebrew acronym for ani ma'amin b'emunah shleima - I believe in complete faith), an engineer by profession. Aura's sister Suzy married Israeli diplomat Abba Eban.

The family was originally from Jaffa, but relocated to Egypt after they were expelled by the Turks during World War I. Herzog attended French schools in Ismailia and Cairo and completed her BA in mathematics and physics at the University of Witwatersrand, South Africa.

In October 1946, Herzog immigrated to Mandatory Palestine. The following year, she was chosen to participate in the first class of the Diplomatic School established by the Jewish Agency. She was a member of the Haganah, a Jewish paramilitary organization in the British Mandate of Palestine (1921–48). In 1947 she married Chaim Herzog. The couple had four children: Yoel, an attorney and former Brigadier General,  Michael, the Israeli Ambassador to the United States, Isaac, the current President of Israel,  and Ronit, a clinical psychologist. 

On 11 March 1948, she was seriously injured in a bombing attack on the Jewish Agency building in the National Institutions House in Jerusalem. During the War of Independence she served as an intelligence officer in the newly founded Science Corps and intelligence department Number 2 (Unit 8200).

Diplomatic career and public service
From 1950 to 1954, she accompanied her husband to the United States, where he was sent as a military attache, and again from 1975 to 1978, when he served as ambassador to the United Nations.

In 1958, Herzog headed the committee that organized Israel's 10th anniversary celebrations and initiated the first International Bible Contest, which takes place annually on Israel Independence Day.

From 1959 to 1968, she headed the Department of Culture in the Ministry of Education and Culture and was a member of the Council for Arts and Culture. In 1969, she founded the Council for a Beautiful Israel, a leading environmental protection NGO and chaired it for 38 years, after which she became its international president.

After the end of her husband's presidency and her own tenure as first lady, she held various positions: Chairperson of the Public Committee for the celebration of Israel's Jubilee celebration (1998), Member of the Public Advisory Board of Mifal Hapayis (Israel's national lottery), Member of the Board of Governors of the Tel Aviv Museum, and Chairperson of Friends of Schneider association at Schneider Children's Medical Center of Israel.

Later life
Aura Herzog died on 10 January 2022, at the age of 97. She is buried alongside her husband and a number of other Israeli leaders in Jerusalem’s Mount Herzl national cemetery. In his eulogy, her son President Isaac Herzog paid tribute to her as “an extremely loving mother for all of us, a source of strength, an engine with incredible energies.”

Published works
In 1971, she published "Secrets of Hospitality," a manual on hospitality, manners and customs.

References

1924 births
2022 deaths
People from Ismailia
Egyptian Ashkenazi Jews
Egyptian emigrants to Mandatory Palestine
Israeli Ashkenazi Jews
Israeli non-fiction writers
Israeli people of Egyptian-Jewish descent
Israeli people of Polish-Jewish descent
Israeli people of Russian-Jewish descent
Spouses of presidents of Israel
Aura Herzog
University of the Witwatersrand alumni
Egyptian expatriates in South Africa
Israeli expatriates in the United States
Burials at Mount Herzl
Israeli environmentalists
Israeli women activists
Israeli women non-fiction writers
Jewish women writers